Cockpit is a 2012 Swedish film directed by Mårten Klingberg.

Plot 
After getting fired from his job as a pilot and dumped by his wife, Valle seeks to find a new job. Out of desperation on the job market he disguises himself as a woman in order to get a job from Silver, a company seeking a female pilot. The lines between his female and male life, as well as his personal and love life, starts to become a blur.

Valle gets drawn deeper into the conspiracy when he accidentally becomes a national hero after a successful emergency landing. "She" is dubbed "an angel in the cockpit".  Media celebrate "her" image as a role model for girls and a living proof that women handle mentally demanding jobs just as well as men.

The bubble is popped when Valle's co-pilot comes forward, claiming that "the angel in the cockpit" panicked so bad that "she" had to be knocked unconscious in order for the plane to be landed safely. Black box recording confirms this version.

The incident quickly becomes the topic of a heated debate concerning women's rights, abilities, and affirmation policies.

Feeling that he owes it to the women he's inadvertently endangered, Valle, still dressed as a woman, reveals his real identity in order to make the public understand that his failure was not a gender issue, but simply the fault of a human being.

Cast 
Jonas Karlsson as Valle
Björn Gustafsson as Albin
Björn Andersson as Harald
Mårten Klingberg as Jens
Chatarina Larsson as Susanna
Sofia Ledarp as Annika
Gustav Levin as Peter
Karin Lithman as Caroline
Tanja Lorentzon
Ellen Mattsson as Maria
Marie Robertson as Cecilia
Måns Westfelt as Gunnar
Carina Söderman as Rakel
Sonny Johnson as Pacient

References

External links 

2012 films
2012 comedy films
2010s Swedish-language films
Films directed by Mårten Klingberg
Swedish comedy films
Cross-dressing in film
2010s Swedish films